Francis Tolson ( 1719 – 1745) was an English poet, dramatist, and the author of several works. He was the Vicar of Easton Maudit and Chaplain to the Rt. Hon.ble the Earl of Sussex.

Works
Octavius Prince of Syra: Or, a Lash for Levi. A Poem (1719)
The Earl of Warwick: Or, British Exile. A Tragedy. As it is Acted at the Theatre Royal in Drury-Lane (1719)
A Poem on His Majesty's Passing the South-Sea Bill (1720)
Proposals for Printing, Hermathenæ: Or, One Hundred and Twenty Moral Emblems, and Ethnick Tales. with Notes (1739)
Hermathenæ, Or Moral Emblems, and Ethnick Tales, with Explanatory Notes (1740)

References

External links
Open Library: Francis Tolson
Google Books: Francis Tolson

18th-century English writers
18th-century English male writers
Writers from London
1745 deaths
Year of birth unknown
18th-century English Anglican priests
English male poets